KCDI may refer to:

 Cambridge Municipal Airport (Ohio) (ICAO code KCDI)
 KCDI-LP, a low-power radio station (99.7 FM) licensed to serve Dodge City, Kansas, United States